Beaver Ruin Creek is a stream in the U.S. state of Georgia. It is a tributary to Sweetwater Creek.

Beaver Ruin Creek was so named from an incident when the home of "Beaver Toter", a Cherokee, was destroyed in a flood.

References

Rivers of Georgia (U.S. state)
Rivers of Gwinnett County, Georgia